"Strange Currencies" is a song by American rock band R.E.M. It was included on their ninth studio album, Monster (1994), and was released as the album's third single on April 18, 1995. The single reached number nine on the UK Singles Chart and peaked at number 47 in the United States.

Composition
Stipe has said that the song is about "when somebody actually thinks that, through words, they're going to be able to convince somebody that they are their one and only."

The song almost did not make it on the album due to its rhythmic similarities to "Everybody Hurts." Yet Michael Stipe's melody, the band felt, was too good to pass over, so the original rhythm was slightly reworked.

Critical reception
Steve Baltin from Cash Box declared "Strange Currencies" as "maybe the sweetest song" from the Monster album. He explained, "There’s a simple longing, mixed with reassuring, in the way Michael Stipe sings “I tripped and fell/did I fall/what I want to feel I want to feel it now.” A sparse but lovely melody accompanies Stipe’s tour de force. [...] Of course it will be a smash at the usual outlets, it’s R.E.M.; but look for this one to break out at Top 40 and maybe even at Adult/Contemporary." Chuck Campbell from Knoxville News Sentinel said it's the song "with perhaps the most enduring appeal" on the album, declaring it as "a languid track on which Stipe explores the enigma of a would-be lover with alternating fits of determination and vulnerability." Howard Hampton from Spin felt it's better than its "tearjerking predecessor", "Everybody Hurts", decribing it as a "tremulous, pledging-my-soul" track.

Music video
The accompanying music video for "Strange Currencies", directed by Mark Romanek, was shot on the first anniversary of the death of Michael Stipe's close friend River Phoenix and features River Phoenix's last girlfriend, actress Samantha Mathis. It also features an early performance by actor and model Norman Reedus. It is in black and white, and shows the band playing in an industrial area. The images of the band are interspersed with other shots, some of which, such as a child playing with a dead bird, suggest urban decay.

Live performances
"Strange Currencies" was played live frequently throughout the Monster tour but was not performed live again until 2003, where the song would then only appear on and off throughout various set lists until their final tour in 2008.

Track listings
 US CD and cassette single, UK 7-inch and cassette single
 "Strange Currencies" (album version) – 3:52
 "Strange Currencies" (instrumental version) – 3:52

 UK maxi-CD and 12-inch single, UK and Australian CD single
 "Strange Currencies" – 3:52
 "Drive" (live) – 4:17 (4:10 in UK)
 "Funtime" (live) – 2:16 (2:20 in UK)
 "Radio Free Europe" (live) – 4:43

Note: All live tracks were recorded at the 40 Watt Club in Athens, Georgia, on November 19, 1992. The performance, a benefit for Greenpeace, was recorded on a solar-powered mobile studio.

Charts

Weekly charts

Year-end charts

Release history

References

External links
Video clip at REMhq.com

1995 singles
American soul songs
Music videos directed by Mark Romanek
R.E.M. songs
Songs written by Bill Berry
Songs written by Peter Buck
Songs written by Mike Mills
Songs written by Michael Stipe
Warner Records singles
1994 songs
Song recordings produced by Scott Litt
Song recordings produced by Michael Stipe
Song recordings produced by Peter Buck
Song recordings produced by Bill Berry
Song recordings produced by Mike Mills